This a list of Tulane Green Wave baseball seasons. The Tulane Green Wave baseball team has represented Tulane University since 1893 and competes in the National Collegiate Athletics Association (NCAA) and the American Athletic Conference (The American). They were previously members of the Southern Intercollegiate Athletic Association (SIAA), Southern Conference (SoCon), Southeastern Conference (SEC), Metro Conference (Metro) and Conference USA (C-USA).

Tulane has appeared in two College World Series.

Season results

Notes

Sources:

References

Tulane
Tulane Green Wave baseball seasons